Hattie Kragten is a Canadian actress. She is known for her roles in Snoopy in Space and Abby Hatcher.

Filmography

Films

Television

References

External links

Living people
21st-century Canadian actresses
Canadian child actresses
Canadian film actresses
Canadian television actresses
Canadian voice actresses
Date of birth missing (living people)
Place of birth missing (living people)
Year of birth missing (living people)